Anand Kumar Bachhawat (born 1 October 1958) is an Indian geneticist, biochemist, professor in biological sciences and the dean of faculty at the Indian Institute of Science Education and Research, Mohali. Known for his studies on microbial genetics, Bachhawat is an elected fellow of all the three major Indian science academies namely Indian Academy of Sciences, National Academy of Sciences, India and Indian National Science Academy.

Bachhawat, an alumnus of the Indian Institute of Technology, Kanpur from where he secured a PhD, heads the Bachawat Lab at the Department of Biological Sciences of IISER Mohali. His studies have been documented by way of a number of articles and the online repository of scientific articles of the Indian Academy of Sciences has listed 29 of them. He also holds patents for the biochemical processes he has developed. The Department of Biotechnology of the Government of India awarded him the National Bioscience Award for Career Development, one of the highest Indian science awards, for his contributions to biosciences in 2000.

Selected bibliography

Chapters

Articles

See also 

 Isoprenoids
 Carotenoid

References

External links 
 

N-BIOS Prize recipients
Academic staff of the Indian Institutes of Science Education and Research
Living people
Fellows of the Indian Academy of Sciences
Fellows of The National Academy of Sciences, India
Fellows of the Indian National Science Academy
1958 births
IIT Kanpur alumni
Indian biochemists
Indian geneticists